Keith Farmer (2 February 1987 – 10 November 2022) was a Northern Irish motorcycle racer. A four-time national champion, he was described as "one of Northern Ireland's most successful motorcyclists".

Farmer retired in 2021 after receiving injuries in accidents. He died suddenly on 10 November 2022, at the age of 35.

Personal life
Farmer was born on 5 February 1987 in Clogher, County Tyrone.

On 4 November 2022, Farmer was found unresponsive and was taken to the Cumberland Infirmary where he died on 10 November.

Racing background
Farmer became 2011 National Superstock 600 champion and National Superstock 1000 champion in 2012 and 2018. He also won 2017 British Supersport Championship. Farmer was a member of prominent BSB teams, including the Paul Bird Motorsport team, Buildbase Suzuki and TAS Racing.

References

1987 births
2022 deaths
Sportspeople from County Tyrone
Motorcycle racers from Northern Ireland